The 2016–17 season was Società Sportiva Calcio Napoli's 71st season in Serie A. The team competed in Serie A, the Coppa Italia, and the UEFA Champions League.

In the league, Napoli enjoyed an excellent campaign, finishing third but scoring a league-high 94 goals, led by Dries Mertens, converted from a winger into a centre-forward, who finished with 28 goals, only one behind capocannoniere Edin Džeko. The club was eliminated in the semi-finals of the Coppa Italia by eventual winners Juventus, and were knocked out of the Champions League in the round of 16 by eventual champions Real Madrid.

Players

Squad information

Transfers

In

Loans in

Out

Loans out

Pre-season and friendlies

Competitions

Overall

Serie A

League table

Results summary

Results by round

Matches

Coppa Italia

UEFA Champions League

Group stage

Knockout phase

Round of 16

Statistics

Appearances and goals

|-
! colspan=14 style="background:#5DAFE3; color:#FFFFFF; text-align:center"| Goalkeepers

|-
! colspan=14 style="background:#5DAFE3; color:#FFFFFF; text-align:center"| Defenders

|-
! colspan=14 style="background:#5DAFE3; color:#FFFFFF; text-align:center"| Midfielders

|-
! colspan=14 style="background:#5DAFE3; color:#FFFFFF; text-align:center"| Forwards

|-
! colspan=14 style="background:#5DAFE3; color:#FFFFFF; text-align:center"| Players transferred out during the season

Goalscorers

Last updated: 28 May 2017

Clean sheets

Last updated: 28 May 2017

Disciplinary record

Last updated: 28 May 2017

References

S.S.C. Napoli seasons
Napoli
Napoli